Paradocus albithorax is a species of beetle in the family Cerambycidae. It was described by Stephan von Breuning in 1938, originally under the genus Hoplocris.

References

Theocridini
Beetles described in 1938